Sergio Lais-Suárez is an Argentine surgeon.

Career
In 2007, Lais-Suárez was named Honorary Consul of India for Cordoba.

References

1957 births
Argentine surgeons
Living people